Félipe Soto (born 3 March 1972) is a Chilean taekwondo practitioner. He competed in the men's 80 kg event at the 2000 Summer Olympics.

References

External links
 

1972 births
Living people
Chilean male taekwondo practitioners
Olympic taekwondo practitioners of Chile
Taekwondo practitioners at the 2000 Summer Olympics
Place of birth missing (living people)
20th-century Chilean people
21st-century Chilean people